Sree Chaitanya Mahavidyalaya, established in 1965, is a college in Habra. It offers undergraduate Honours & General courses in Science, Commerce and Arts. It also offers postgraduate degree in commerce. It is affiliated to West Bengal State University.

Departments

Science, Arts and Commerce
(Honours Subjects)
Bengali
English 
History
Sanskrit
Education
Physical Education
Human Development
Food and Nutrition
Commerce
Computer Science
Mathematics
Physics
Chemistry
Physiology 
Microbiology

B.A General
B.Sc General
B.Com General

Accreditation
Sree Chaitanya Mahavidyalaya is awarded a A grade (in Cycle-2) by the NAAC, recognized by the University Grants Commission (UGC).
Sree Chaitanya Mahavidyalaya is also a 'ISO-9001-2015' certified institution.

References

Universities and colleges in North 24 Parganas district
Colleges affiliated to West Bengal State University
Educational institutions established in 1965
1965 establishments in West Bengal